Dale E. Brandland is a former member of the Washington State Senate, representing the 42nd district from 2002 to 2010 as a Republican.

Awards

Brandland was the recipient of a 2009 Fuse "Sizzle" Award. He was given the Profiles in Courage Sizzle Award for voting for a bill expanding domestic partnership rights for same sex couples and their families in the face of significant opposition from his fell party members in the state Legislature.

References

https://web.archive.org/web/20140109010256/http://countyleadershipinstitute.com/Senator%20Dale%20E.pdf

Year of birth missing (living people)
Living people
Washington State University alumni
Republican Party Washington (state) state senators